"Bitter Desire" is a song by Australian pop/new wave group Kids in the Kitchen. The song was released in April 1984 as the second single from their debut studio album Shine (1985). The song peaked at number 17 on the Australian Kent Music Report.

On 15 April 1984, the group performed "Bitter Desire" at the annual Countdown Music and Video Awards, where they were nominated for 'Most Promising New Talent' and 'Best Debut Single' for "Change in Mood".

Line-up changes
By the time of the single's release and despite appearing in the videoclip for it, lead guitarist Greg Dorman and keyboardist Greg Woodhead had departed the line-up to be replaced by Claude Carranza and Alistair Coia, respectively.

Reception
Countdown Magazine said at the time of release, "if "Change in Mood" had been merely promising, "Bitter Desire" should seal [their] fate. That record is simply the best Australian single so far this year, and displays a depth of inspiration beyond any mere beginner's luck."

Track listing 
7" (K9353) 
Side A "Bitter Desire" - 3:45
Side B "Hunting and Haunting" - 3:42

12"' (X13147)
Side A1 "Bitter Desire" (Kitchen Mix) - 5:48
Side B1 "Bitter Desire" (instrumental) - 3:45
Side B2 "Hunting and Haunting" (instrumental) - 3:42

Charts

Weekly charts

Year-end charts

References 

1984 songs
1984 singles
Kids in the Kitchen songs
Mushroom Records singles